The 7mm Penna, also known as the 7×23mm is a handgun cartridge designed by Leonardo Penna for law enforcement applications. The cartridge utilises a novel lightweight, pointed projectile made from brass travelling at high velocity with the intention of giving it limited armor-piercing capabilities and greater stopping power.

There has been rumours of Fiocchi of Italy developing this cartridge for the sport of competitive shooting especially for IPSC competitions.  STI chambered a few of their Nemesis line of 1911 clones for this cartridge but ceased shortly thereafter due to very little demand for such a handgun in this chambering. 

This cartridge family also includes a 7x28mmR rimmed cartridge designed for use in revolvers and longer cartridges for use in carbines and rifles.

See also
 7 mm caliber
 List of cartridges by caliber
 List of handgun cartridges
 List of rifle cartridges
 Table of handgun and rifle cartridges

References

Pistol and rifle cartridges
Paramilitary cartridges